Running with Scissors is a 2006 American comedy-drama film written and directed by Ryan Murphy, based on Augusten Burroughs' 2002 memoir of the same name, and starring Joseph Cross, Annette Bening, Brian Cox, Joseph Fiennes, Evan Rachel Wood, Alec Baldwin, Jill Clayburgh and Gwyneth Paltrow. The semi-autobiographical account of Burroughs' childhood (when his real name was still Christopher Robison), based on his best-selling book, received mixed reviews as a film.

Plot
Burroughs’ early life is spent in a clean and orderly home. He worries about his clothes and hair, among other normal concerns. His parents, meawhile, argue constantly in the background.

Soon, his parents separate, and Burroughs is sent to live with his mother’s psychiatrist while she questions her sexuality. Burroughs goes to Dr. Finch, who lives in Northampton in a rundown Victorian house with his wife, Agnes. With them are a number of biological and adopted children who live in the house, as well as many of Finch’s own patients. There are essentially no rules within the household. Young people are having sex, smoking cigarettes and pot, and rebelling against authority figures. Finch believes that all of them are mature enough to be in charge of their own lives. Despite all of this, the issues that take place in Finch’s household seem to be dwarfed by Burroughs’ mother’s frequent psychotic episodes.

The Finch house represents, and in many ways, is a complete parallel to what Burroughs was used to. It is dirty and infested with bugs. Dirty dishes are left unwashed; the Christmas tree hangs decorated all year. The stairs are so rickety that Burroughs believes he will fall through them if he climbs them. Finch eventually begins to believe that God is communicating with him through his bowel movements. Incredibly, Finch begins to develop a kind of divination to attempt to understand these messages.

Hope, Finch’s second daughter, thinks her cat in dying. She decides to leave it trapped underneath a laundry basket for four days, speeding up the process.

Meanwhile, Burroughs’ mother is showcased in greater detail. She is vain, emotionally unstable, and not even slightly responsible or capable enough to be a parent. She engages in a sexual affair with a minister’s wife. Burroughs discovers this accidentally. While skipping school one day he walks in on the two of them. His mother ends this relationship and starts a new one, this time with an African American lady. This relationship is unstable and unhealthy as well.
A new mental patient arrives at the Victorian house. This is soon after another of Burroughs’ mother’s breakdowns, during which she plays the role of his father. The patient’s name is Cesar, a man who tries to rape Burroughs unsuccessfully while he is sleeping. Burroughs’ mother has another psychotic episode and tries to attack Burroughs while she is moving her belongings out of the house. Burroughs’ mother is eventually restrained on a bed.

Burroughs discovers he is gay. He tells the doctor’s son, Neil Bookman. He was sexually abused by Bookman, who forced him to perform oral sex on him. They form a destructive relationship, during which Burroughs’ opinion of Bookman often flip flops. One day he is desperate for attention and the next he can’t wait to get away from the guy. No one seems to be even slightly bothered by this relationship. Bookman becomes obsessed with the boy, and Burroughs threatens to charge him with statutory rape. Eventually Bookman leaves for New York City and is never heard from again, despite Burroughs and the Finch family doing everything they can to contact him.

The next relationship that Burroughs begins to form is with one of Finch’s daughters, a girl named Natalie. At the beginning of the movie, Burroughs actually hates her. Now, though, they do everything together, including looking for jobs together, running around the back of a waterfall, and destroying the kitchen in the Victorian house. The two leave the Finch household together.

The end of the film concludes with Burroughs living in his own apartment with Natalie. He is faced with the choice between defending Dr. Finch or his mother. She has accused the doctor of raping her in a motel in order to “cure her” of her psychotic breakdowns. Burroughs considers both his mother and Finch’s family as his own, and he can’t choose. He internally believes that Finch did, in fact, rape his mother. Burroughs decides once and for all to leave Massachusetts. He moves to New York City, and despite not having any kind of plan, he is determined to succeed and make one as he goes.

Cast

 Joseph Cross as Augusten Burroughs
 Jack Kaeding as 6-year-old Augusten
 Annette Bening as Deirdre Burroughs
 Brian Cox as Dr. Finch
 Joseph Fiennes as Neil Bookman
 Evan Rachel Wood as Natalie Finch
 Alec Baldwin as Norman Burroughs
 Jill Clayburgh as Agnes Finch
 Gwyneth Paltrow as Hope Finch
 Gabrielle Union as Dorothy Ambrose
 Patrick Wilson as Michael Shephard
 Kristin Chenoweth as Fern Stewart
 Dagmara Dominczyk as Suzanne
 Colleen Camp as Joan
 Augusten Burroughs (uncredited) as himself

Reception

Critical response
The review aggregator website Metacritic gave Running with Scissors a score of 52 out of 100, based on 32 critics, indicating "mixed or average reviews". On Rotten Tomatoes, the film holds a 31% approval rating, based on 133 reviews, with an average score of 5/10. The site's consensus states: "Despite a few great performances, the film lacks the sincerity and emotional edge of Burroughs' well-loved memoir."

Accolades

Soundtrack
The soundtrack for the film was released on September 26, 2006, a month prior to the film's release.

 "Pick Up the Pieces" – Average White Band
 "Blinded by the Light" – Manfred Mann's Earth Band
 "The Things We Do for Love" – 10cc
 "Mr. Blue" – Catherine Feeny
 "One Less Bell to Answer" – The 5th Dimension
 "Quizás, Quizás, Quizás" (Perhaps, Perhaps, Perhaps) – Nat King Cole
 "Poetry Man" – Phoebe Snow
 "Bennie and the Jets" – Elton John
 "Year of the Cat" – Al Stewart
 "O Tannenbaum" – Vince Guaraldi Trio
 "A Great Ocean Liner" – James S. Levine
 "Stardust" – Nat King Cole
 "Teach Your Children" – Crosby, Stills, Nash & Young

An adaptation of Telepopmusik's "Another Day" was also an underlying theme that recurred several times throughout the film. "Waltz for Debby", "Very Early", and "Re: Person I Knew", by Bill Evans are used in the film as well. The song playing in the "Stew" scene is "d-moll" by the duo Tosca from their album Delhi 9; this theme is repeated through the film.

See also
 List of lesbian, gay, bisexual, or transgender-related films by storyline

References

External links
 
 
 
 
 
 

2000s American films
2000s English-language films
2006 films
2006 comedy-drama films
2006 directorial debut films
2006 LGBT-related films
2000s coming-of-age comedy-drama films
American coming-of-age comedy-drama films
American LGBT-related films
Comedy-drama films based on actual events
Films about dysfunctional families
Films about psychiatry
Films based on memoirs
Films directed by Ryan Murphy (writer)
Films produced by Brad Pitt
Films produced by Ryan Murphy (writer)
Films set in the 1970s
Films set in Massachusetts
Films shot in Los Angeles
Films with screenplays by Ryan Murphy (writer)
Gay-related films
Lesbian-related films
LGBT-related black comedy films
LGBT-related comedy-drama films
LGBT-related coming-of-age films
LGBT-related films based on actual events
Plan B Entertainment films
TriStar Pictures films
Films produced by Brad Grey